A Cold Warrior is an active participant in the Cold War.

Cold Warrior or Cold Warriors may also refer to:
Cold Warrior (TV series), a 1984 British television series
"Cold Warriors", an episode of Futurama
Cold Warrior: James Jesus Angleton: The CIA's Master Spy Hunter, a 1992 book by Tom Mangold
Richard H. Kirk or Cold Warrior, British musician